Lights Out Paris is the first studio album by American hip hop artist Sims, a member of Minneapolis indie hip hop collective Doomtree. It was released July 28, 2005 on Doomtree Records and includes guest appearances from P.O.S, Crescent Moon, and Toki Wright, among others. The album was re-released with four remixes and five songs from Sims' False Hopes Four on vinyl in June 2015.

Music 
The album is produced by Lazerbeak, MK Larada, P.O.S, Tom Servo and Paper Tiger. It features Mike Mictlan, Toki Wright, Crescent Moon, Cecil Otter, P.O.S and Dessa.

Track listing

Personnel 
Adapted from Discogs

 Sims - primary artist
 MK Larada - executive producer, producer , additional production
 P.O.S - executive producer, featured artist , producer 
 Joe Mabbott - engineer, mixed by, producer 
 Dave Gardner - mastered by
 Turbo Nemesis - mixed by
 Tom Servo - producer 
 Mike Mictlan - featured artist 
 Toki Wright - featured artist 
 Lazerbeak - producer 
 Sean McPherson - bass 
 Brandon - producer 
 Benzilla - producer 
 Crescent Moon - featured artist 
 Paper Tiger - producer 
 Cecil Otter - featured artist 
 Dessa - featured artist

References

External links 
 Lights Out Paris at Bandcamp
 Lights Out Paris at Discogs

Doomtree Records albums
2005 albums
Sims (rapper) albums